Juan "Pachín" Vicéns Sastre (September 7, 1934 – February 18, 2007) was a Puerto Rican basketball player. Vicéns was famous for his performance with the Leones de Ponce and with the Puerto Rican national basketball team. During the 1959 FIBA World Championship in Chile, Vicéns was declared to be the Best Player in the World.

Basketball career
Juan Vicéns Sastre was born in Ciales, Puerto Rico. He was the sixth child of José 'Pepito' Vicéns Batalla and Antonia 'doña Lila' Sastre. In 1949, he moved to Ponce to study in the Colegio Ponceño encouraged by his brother Enrique "Coco" Vicéns, who was already playing with the Lions.

After moving, he started visiting the practices and filling in for the team when a player was needed. In 1950, he finally debuted in the National Superior Basketball (BSN) league with the Ponce Lions. In 1952, he led the Lions to their first championship, and was declared the Most Valuable Player of the series. In 1954, he repeated the feat with another championship and his second MVP award.

Also, from 1954 to 1956, Vicéns played point guard at Kansas State University, under the tutelage of Tex Winter (Winter was a mentor of future Chicago Bulls/L.A. Lakers coach, Phil Jackson). In 1956, he led Kansas State to the NCAA Sweet Sixteen.

During his sixteen years with the Ponce Lions, he led them to ten finals, and seven championship titles. In 1958, he was the scoring leader of the league, and was selected the league's Most Valuable Player two more times (1958 and 1960). He was also the first player to score 5,000 points in the league, retiring with a total of 5,102. At the end of the 1950s, he received an invitation to play for the New York Knicks, but he declined, so he could continue playing with Ponce and with the Puerto Rican team.

Vicéns was a member of the Puerto Rican National Basketball Team and represented the island in four Central American and Caribbean Games, two World Championships and two Olympic Games. It was at the 1959 FIBA World Championship, held in Antofagasta, Chile that Vicéns was elected as the World's Best Basketball Player, while also being named among the five best players of the tournament.

In 1966, Vicéns—along with Juan "Johnny" Báez and Teo Cruz—led the National team to a gold medal at the Caribbean and Central American Games held in San Juan.

Post-career
After retiring as an active basketball player in 1966, he kept involved in sports as a radio commentator.

Later years
He was the final torchbearer and lighted the cauldron at the 1993 Central American and Caribbean Games held in Ponce.

During the second half of 2006, Vicéns' health started to deteriorate to the point that he had to have his legs amputated. Due to his illness he had to be hospitalized several times, and finally died on February 18, 2007, at his home in Ponce at the age of 72.

Legacy
In 1972, the Ponce Lions gave their new venue the name of Juan Pachín Vicéns Coliseum. The venue is still decorated with Vicéns memorabilia like pictures, shirts, and a sculpture.

On May 25, 2007, Vicéns was officially named as a FIBA Hall of Fame candidate. The list of candidates includes a total of 34 world-renowned basketball figures.

In 1992, the city of Ponce once more recognized his achievements with a plaque at the Park for the Illustrious Ponce Citizens.

See also 
 List of Puerto Ricans
 National Superior Basketball
 Basketball at the 1960 Summer Olympics

Notes

References

External links 
 Gallery of Pictures of Puerto Rican players at enciclopediapr.org
 Biography
  Deaths in February 2007

1934 births
2007 deaths
Baloncesto Superior Nacional players
Basketball players at the 1959 Pan American Games
Basketball players at the 1960 Summer Olympics
Basketball players at the 1963 Pan American Games
Basketball players at the 1964 Summer Olympics
Leones de Ponce basketball players
Sportspeople from Ponce, Puerto Rico
Kansas State Wildcats men's basketball players
Olympic basketball players of Puerto Rico
People from Ciales, Puerto Rico
Point guards
Puerto Rican men's basketball players
1959 FIBA World Championship players
1963 FIBA World Championship players
Puerto Rico men's national basketball team players
Shooting guards
Pan American Games medalists in basketball
Pan American Games silver medalists for Puerto Rico
Pan American Games bronze medalists for Puerto Rico
Medalists at the 1963 Pan American Games